Judgement Days is the second studio album by English singer and rapper Ms. Dynamite. It was released on 3 October 2005 by Polydor Records. Chink Santana, Stephen Marsden, Christian Karlsson, and Lil Wayne collaborated on several tracks.

Themes
Judgement Days is similar to Ms. Dynamite's first work, drawing inspiration from a number of personal themes in her life as a basis for humane political commentary in a climate of increasing paranoia. However, it also supposedly reflected the fact she had matured as a performer, including having performed at Live 8 earlier that year.

Commercial performance
Upon its release in the United Kingdom and Ireland in October 2005, the album peaked at number 43 on the UK Albums Chart, spending two weeks on the chart. It was not promoted well in Europe or Australia, and later that year Polydor officially dropped Ms. Dynamite from the record label.

Critical reception

On Metacritic, Judgement Days has a score of 59 out of 100 from seven reviews, indicating "mixed or average" reception. Jon O'Brien, writing for AllMusic, gave the album two-and-a-half out of five stars. He criticised its themes and tone, saying "the pure anger and constant preaching on Judgement Days makes you feel like you're being repeatedly battered over the head at a highly fraught protest march...overall, Judgement Days is a disappointing follow-up to its predecessor, which managed to address difficult issues without descending into self-indulgence and self-righteousness. The carefree party sound of her two-step garage beginnings seems a long, long time ago".

Reviewing the album for NME, Dan Martin wrote that "There's a fine, fine line between angry punk and sanctimonious nagging that's crossed too often here", naming "Back Then" the stand-out track because it is "gleefully nostalgic". Martin still found the beats "slick and the vocals flawless" and called Dynamite "a brilliant, precocious talent – just one moving too slowly, and in the wrong direction".

Matilda Egere-Cooper of the BBC opined that "the intensity of [Dynamite's] strop overshadows the album's lighter touches", finding it to have an "overall 'down' feel". Egere-Cooper nonetheless concluded that "Dynamite hasn't lost her values, and it's this that makes Judgement Days a worthwhile, if not entirely satisfying, album".

Track listing
"Judgement Day" – 4:23
"Father" – 3:56
"Put Your Gun Away" (featuring Sincere) – 4:11
"Back Then" – 3:47
"Fall in Love Again" – 3:32
"Not Today" – 3:32
"You Don't Have to Cry" (featuring Lil Wayne) – 4:46
"Unbreakable" – 3:30
"Pain" – 4:23
"Shavaar" – 4:08
"Gotta Let It Go" – 4:12
"She Don't Live Here Anymore" (featuring Chink Santana) – 5:00
"Mr Prime Minister" – 4:45

Limited edition
Disc one
"Self Destruct" (featuring Assassin) – 4:49
"Gotta Let It Go" – 4:12
"She Don't Live Here Anymore" (featuring Chink Santana) – 5:00
"Mr Prime Minister" – 4:45
"Redemption Song" – 3:08

Disc two
"Judgement Day" (video)
"Father" (video)

Charts

References

2005 albums
Albums produced by Bloodshy & Avant
Ms. Dynamite albums
Polydor Records albums